Idia Aisien is a Nigerian-American model, TV presenter, and actress.

Early life
Aisien is of Nigerian and Cameroonian descent. She was born on 4 July 1991, in Lagos to champagne magnate, Joe Aisien, and jeweler, Emmanuella Aisien.

As a teenager, Aisien attended Atlantic Hall High School, in Lagos. She then moved to the United States, where she attained a B.A. in journalism from American University in Washington, D.C., and an M.S. in international public relations and global corporate communications from New York University.

Career

Modelling
Aisien has worked with Fox 5 News, the AARP Foundation, Discovery Communications, the Foreign Policy Initiative, the United Nations, and Atlas Mara. She has modeled for many brands, such as BMW, Vogue, LAN Airlines, Aura, Black Opal, Nivea, Alice + Olivia, J Brand, Cashhimi, Samantha Pleet, Jovani, Evelyn Lambert, Nikki Angelique, An Alili and Sway Hair Ltd. In Nigeria, Idia currently hosts You Got Issues and Style 101 on Spice TV, and the Mega Millions Lottery Draw on Silverbird.

Aisien has described herself as being "Smart. Strong. Funny. Complicated. Deep". She currently works with the International News TV Station – Arise News Guardian woman

she did open up that a stranger gifted her a range rover on the Me, Her and Everything Else podcast, hosted by actress Stephanie Coker.

Acting
Aisen featured as the lead character in the remake of the Nollywood classic Nneka The Pretty Serpent, which was released on 18 December 2020.

References

External links

Official website

1991 births
American female models
Nigerian female models
Living people
Female models from New York (state)
Models from New York City
21st-century American women
21st-century Nigerian actresses
American University alumni
Nigerian television presenters
Nigerian television personalities
Nigerian film actresses
New York University alumni
Nigerian people of Cameroonian descent